Huda may refer to:

People with the name 

 Huda (given name), an index of people with the given name
 Huda (surname), an index of people with the surname

Entities with the name 

 Haryana Urban Development Authority (HUDA), the urban planning agency of the Haryana state, India
 Hyderabad Urban Development Authority, the urban planning agency of the city of Hyderabad India that was expanded and renamed Hyderabad Metropolitan Development Authority
ST Huda, a tugboat operated by Kuwait Oil Company from 1954 to 1965, and then by H H Deeb, until 1967
Huda TV, a satellite television channel in Saudi Arabia

Education

 Al Huda Central School, Kadampuzha, Indian school
 Al-Huda Institute, a series of Islamic educational institutions for women in Pakistan and Canada
 Al Huda School (Maryland), school in Maryland
 Al-Huda School (New Jersey), school in New Jersey
 Darul Huda Islamic University, Indian University
Jamiatul Ilm Wal Huda, British boarding school

Mosques
Baitul Huda Mosque, Sydney, mosque in Australia
Baitul Huda Mosque, Usingen, mosque in Germany
Masjid Al-Huda, mosque in Singapore
Nurul Huda Mosque, mosque in Indonesia

Commercial businesses
Huda Beauty, cosmetics line
Huda Beer, brand owned by Carlsberg Group
Huda Tower, MIDROC headquarters in Ethiopia

Places
HUDA City Centre metro station, Indian terminal station
Huda Jama, Slovenian settlement
Huda Polica, Slovenian settlement
Qubaybat Abu al-Huda, Syrian village

Other
Huda Boss, American reality television show
Kitab al-Huda, religious book
Shamsul Huda Stadium, stadium in Bangladesh

See also 

Hoda (disambiguation)
Houda (given name)
Houda (surname)